Zoltán Bognár (born 9 February 1988) is a profession sukel Slovak footballer of Hungarian ethnicity currently plays for Slovak club TJ OFC Gabčíkovo.

External links
 Zoltán Bognár 1. FC Tatran Prešov profile 

1988 births
Living people
Association football forwards
Slovak footballers
Hungarians in Slovakia
FC DAC 1904 Dunajská Streda players
Slovak Super Liga players
1. FC Tatran Prešov players
ŠK Senec players
FK Bodva Moldava nad Bodvou players